K&K may refer to:

 Kevin and Kell, a webcomic
 Kenan & Kel, an American sitcom
 kaiserlich und königlich, the court/government of the Habsburgs
 Kath & Kim, an Australian comedy/sitcom TV series
 Kath & Kim (American TV series), an American comedy/sitcom TV series based on the Australian series
 Knox and Kane Railroad, a railroad in the United States
 Korn and Korn, a mathematics book

See also 
 KK (disambiguation)